The bee beetles are scarab beetles of the subfamily Cetoniinae.

They have hairy sides of the elytra like their relatives, and the upper sides of the elytra are usually yellow with prominent black blotches which form incomplete bands. This, and the fact that seen from the side they resemble a hairy plump bee, has given them their common name.

Species
 Trichius abdominalis Ménétriés, 1832
 Trichius fasciatus (Linnaeus, 1758)
 Trichius gallicus Dejean, 1821 (= T. rosaceus)
 Trichius japonicus
 Trichius orientalis Reitter, 1894
 Trichius sexualis Bedel, 1906

References

External links

Trichius fasciatus photos at Beetlespace.wz.cz

Cetoniinae